Crudia bibundina is a species of legume in the family Fabaceae.
It is found only in Cameroon.
Its natural habitat is subtropical or tropical dry forests.
It is threatened by habitat loss.

References

bibundina
Flora of Cameroon
Critically endangered plants
Taxonomy articles created by Polbot